San Marcos is the Spanish name of Saint Mark. It may also refer to:

Towns and cities

Argentina 
 San Marcos, Salta

Colombia 
 San Marcos, Antioquia
 San Marcos, Sucre

Costa Rica 
 San Marcos, Costa Rica (aka San Marcos de Tarrazú)

Ecuador 
 San Marcos, Quito

El Salvador 
 San Marcos, El Salvador

Guatemala 
 San Marcos Department
 San Marcos, Guatemala

Honduras 
 San Marcos de Caiquín
 San Marcos de Colón
 San Marcos, Ocotepeque
 San Marcos, Santa Bárbara

Mexico 
 San Marcos, Baja California Sur
 San Marcos, Guerrero
 San Marcos, Jalisco

Nicaragua 
 San Marcos, Carazo

Peru 
 San Marcos, Cajamarca
 San Marcos Province

United States 
 San Marcos, California
 Lake San Marcos, California
 California State University San Marcos (in relation to other CSU campuses)
 Cal State San Marcos Cougars, athletics teams
 San Marcos, Texas
 San Marcos River, Texas

Other 
 Castillo de San Marcos in St. Augustine, Florida; massive Spanish fortification, the oldest extant masonry fort in today's United States
 FC San Marcos, Nicaraguan football club
 La Casona de San Marcos, a large colonial building in Lima, Peru
 Jardín de San Marcos, a Garden located in the Historic Centre of Aguascalientes, Mexico
 National University of San Marcos, Peru
 San Marcos de Apalache Historic State Park, Florida, U.S.; site of a 17th/18th-century Spanish fort along the Gulf Coast; utilized up through the 19th-century American Civil War
 San Marcos de Arica, Chilean football club
 San Marcos High School (Santa Barbara, California), U.S.
 San Marcos, a fictional Central American banana republic in the 1971 motion picture Bananas, in an episode of The A-Team, and in a 2014 episode of Archer
 San Marcos, León, former monastery in León
 USS San Marcos (LSD-25), a warship of the United States Navy

See also 
 San Marco (disambiguation)
 Saint Mark (disambiguation)